Ashley Campbell may refer to:

 Ashley Campbell (tennis) (1880–1943), Australian tennis player
 Ashley Campbell (actor) (born 1979), British stage and television actor
 Ashley Campbell (musician), singer-songwriter and daughter of Glen Campbell

See also
 George Ashley Campbell (1870–1954), American electrical engineer